David Monro (1813–1877) was a New Zealand politician. 

David Monro may also refer to:
 David Monro (merchant) ( – 1834), seigneur, businessman and political figure in Lower Canada
 David Monro (scholar) (1836–1905), Scottish Homeric scholar
 David Monro (police officer) (1839–1909), Scottish police officer